The BARLA Cumbria Cup is an amateur rugby league knock-out competition for clubs in the county of Cumbria. The cup is administered by the Cumberland Amateur Rugby League Association, a branch of the British Amateur Rugby League Association, and has been played for since 1982.

The final was traditionally played around Christmas time every year. The cup's most successful club is Kells, who have won the final ten times.

Past winners

Final Record by Club

See also

 British Amateur Rugby League Association
 Cumberland League
 Barrow & District League
 North West Counties
 BARLA National Cup

References

External links
 BARLA Official Website

Rugby league in Cumbria
BARLA competitions